Quality Street is a comedy in four acts by J. M. Barrie, written before his more famous work Peter Pan.  The story is about two sisters who start a school "for genteel children".

The original Broadway production opened in 1901 and ran for only 64 performances.  The show was then produced in London, where it was a hit, running for 459 performances.  It was frequently revived until World War II.

Roles and 1902 London cast

Valentine Brown – Suitor of Miss Phoebe – Seymour Hicks
Miss Phoebe Throssel – A School Mistress – Ellaline Terriss
Miss Livvy – Alter ego of Phoebe –  Ellaline Terriss
Ensign Blades – A Young Officer – A. Vane Tempest
Lieutenant Spicer – A Young Officer – Vincent Sternroyd
Susan Throssel – Sister to Phoebe – Marion Terry
Patty – Maid-of-all-work in service of the Throssel sisters – Rosini Filippi
Recruiting Sergeant – George Shelton
A Waterloo Veteran – Charles Daly
Arthur Wellesley Tomson – George Hersee
Miss Willoughby – Henrietta Watson
Miss Fanny Willoughby – Irene Rooke
Miss Henrietta Turnbull – Constance Hyem
Miss Charlotte Parratt – May Taverner
Isabella – Winifred Hall
Harriett – Edith Heslewood

Plot
The play is set in Napoleonic times.

Act 1
There is heightened anticipation as the local gossips of the town discuss the developing relationship between Miss Phoebe Throssel and Valentine Brown. Phoebe then confesses to her sister, Susan, that Brown intends to drop by later that day, and both are certain he means to propose. When he finally does appear, it is not to ask for Phoebe's hand in marriage but to announce his intention to join the fight in Europe against Napoleon. This leaves the girls devastated.

Act 2
Ten years after the departure of Brown, we find the girls have set up a school in order to pay the rent. Phoebe has not accepted any other suitor and has allowed herself to become an "Old Maid" and school mistress.  Phoebe, however, longs for her youth, and the return of Captain Brown only deepens her melancholy. "I am tired of being lady-like," she declares. With some encouragement from her maid, Patty, she creates the fictional character of Miss Livvy, a more energetic, flirtatious and naughty version of her younger self, and begins to tease Captain Brown who, captivated by her, persuades her and Susan to accompany him to the ball.

Act 3

At the ball, and Phoebe is still playing the part of Miss Livvy. In this guise, she has captured the eyes of many of the young men and the scorn of ladies. However, Phoebe is now annoyed that Brown seems to prefer this unsubstantial 'young' flirt that she has created to her true personality and qualities. Her actions cause events to come to a head as her act is almost brought to light by the local gossiping girls Fanny Willoughby and Henrietta Turnbull. In a final confrontation with Captain Brown, we discover that he has found his love for Miss Phoebe and not for Miss Livvy, as he insists that "I have discovered for myself that the schoolmistress in her old maid's cap is the noblest Miss Phoebe of them all."

Act 4
Miss Livvy still hangs heavy over the sisters: having been created, she is now difficult to dispose of. The local gossips watch for any sign of Miss Livvy and frequently visit the sisters' home. Brown comes to ask for Phoebe’s hand and is turned down without explanation.  As a result, he becomes aware of the disguise and the sisters' plight and sets out to right all wrongs, even his own.

Productions
The play opened on October 11, 1901, at the Valentine Theatre in Toledo, Ohio, and arrived in New York to play at the Knickerbocker Theatre on November 11, 1901, produced by Charles Frohman and starring Maude Adams, but ran for only a modestly successful 64 performances. It then opened at the Vaudeville Theatre in London on 17 September 1902 and ran for a very successful 459 performances, starring Ellaline Terriss, Seymour Hicks and Marion Terry, making it one of the first American productions to score a bigger triumph in London than in New York.

The piece enjoyed numerous revivals and tours until World War II.  These included a 1913 revival at London's Duke of York's Theatre.  A brief revival played in 1908 at the Empire Theatre in New York, starring Adams, and other revivals followed in America, at least into the 1920s.

In 2010, London's Finborough Theatre mounted the first professional production of the piece in London in over six decades.

In 2020, Northern Broadsides performed the play at the Viaduct Theatre in Halifax, directed by Laurie Sansom, with the addition of commentary from present-day employees at the Quality Street chocolates factory. and toured to The Lowry, Salford; The Dukes, Lancaster; and the Theatre Royal, Bury St Edmunds, before closing due to the coronavirus pandemic.

Adaptations and legacy
The play was adapted twice for film; the first, in 1927 starred Marion Davies, and  the second, in 1937, starred Katharine Hepburn. A musical theatre adaptation, Dear Miss Phoebe, written by Christopher Hassall and Harry Parr Davies, premiered in 1950.

The play was so popular that Quality Street chocolates and caramels were named after it, and the confectionery originally used characters from the play in their advertising and packaging. When Hicks and Terriss moved to a new home, The Old Forge at Merstham, Surrey, their cul-de-sac was renamed "Quality Street".

Notes

External links
 
 
 
 
Information about the Broadway production
Review, cast list, photos of the London production
Photos from Quality Street

1901 plays
Plays by J. M. Barrie
British plays adapted into films
Plays set in England
West End plays